Sprouse is a surname. Notable people with the surname include:

Bill Sprouse Jr. (born 1975), American Christian evangelist and singer
Chris Sprouse (born 1966), American comic book artist
Cole Sprouse (born 1992), American actor
Dylan Sprouse (born 1992), American actor
Stephen Sprouse (1953–2004), American fashion designer
Vic Sprouse (contemporary), American politician from West Virginia

See also
Sprouse-Reitz, also known as Sprouse!, defunct variety store chain based in Portland, Oregon
Sprouses Corner, Virginia